Zakharovo is a rural locality (a selo) in Dumchevsky Selsoviet, Zalesovsky District, Altai Krai, Russia. The population was 59 as of 2013. There are 4 streets.

Geography 
Zakharovo is located 26 km west of Zalesovo (the district's administrative centre) by road. Dumchevo is the nearest rural locality.

References 

Rural localities in Zalesovsky District